Cambewarra Village is a locality in the City of Shoalhaven in New South Wales, Australia. It lies on Main Road, which runs west from Cambewarra Road, which forms part of the Kangaroo Valley–Nowra road, about 9 km northwest of Nowra and south of Cambewarra Mountain. Cambewarra Village is largely surrounded by the locality of Cambewarra.

References

City of Shoalhaven
Localities in New South Wales